The Council elections held in Wolverhampton in 2003 were one third, and 20 of the 60 seats were up for election.

Average turnout for the City was 29.36%

Wednesfield South ward was notable in that the majority was only 2 votes, representing a majority of only 0.07% over the second placed candidate.

Election result

2003
2000s in the West Midlands (county)
2003 English local elections